Bodhi Magazine is a 72-page internationally distributed full-color glossy format Buddhist periodical that is issued on a quarterly basis. It is based in Seattle. First printed in 1997, its content is created by and for Nyingma and Kagyu sanghas. It was founded by Dzogchen Ponlop Rinpoche. Snow Lion Publications has dubbed the magazine "the voice of Nalandabodhi in Seattle", as it features many articles, songs, and poems by the renowned tulkus Dzogchen Ponlop Rinpoche, Khenpo Tsultrim Gyamtso Rinpoche, and the 17th Gyalwa Karmapa, as well as from other teachers associated with the Nalandabodhi sangha.

References

External links
 Official Website (US)
 Bodhi Magazine Goes National by Snow Lion Publications, 2003

1997 establishments in Washington (state)
Buddhist magazines
Magazines established in 1997
Magazines published in Seattle
Religious magazines published in the United States
Quarterly magazines published in the United States